The Immortal Garrison is a 1956 Soviet war film directed by Zakhar Agranenko and Eduard Tisse.

Plot summary 
This film depicts the siege of the Brest Fortress during the period of June 22 through July 20, 1941 at the beginning of The Great Patriotic War.

Cast 
Vasili Makarov as Baturin
Vladimir Yemelyanov as Kondratiev
Nikolai Kryuchkov as Kukharkov
Anatoli Chemodurov as Rudenko
Valentina Serova as Maria Nikolayevna
Lidiya Sukharevskaya as Aleksandra Petrovna
Antonina Bogdanova
L. Naryshkina
Gennadi Sajfulin
Nadezhda Fandikova
Feliks Yavorsky
Vladimir Monakhov

Soundtrack 
Veniamin Basner began his career composing music for this film.

Footnotes

External links 

1956 films
1950s Russian-language films
1950s war drama films
Soviet black-and-white films
Soviet World War II films
Soviet war drama films
1956 drama films